Czapski (feminine: Czapska) is a Polish surname. 

It belongs to Polish noble  (also Hutten-Czapski) of Leliwa coat of arms heraldic clan. 

The surname may refer to:
Jan Chryzostom Czapski  (1656 – 1716), Polish statesman
Józef Czapski (1896 – 1993) Polish artist, author, critic, and an officer of the Polish Army
Ceclava Czapska (1899–1970), impostor of  Grand Duchess Maria Romanov
Maria Czapska (1894–1981), Polish writer and historian
Emeryk August Hutten-Czapski (1897–1979), politician, military officer, diplomat and Bailiff of the Polish Sovereign Military Order of Malta
Karol Hutten-Czapski (1860–1904), Mayor of Minsk between 1890 and 1901
Bogdan Hutten-Czapski  (1851–1937), politician, curator of the University of Warsaw and the Warsaw University of Technology, President of the Association of Polish Knights of Malta
Emeryk Hutten-Czapski (1828–1896), politician, historical collector and numismatist, founder of The Emeryk Hutten-Czapski Museum
Stanislaw Hutten-Czapski (1779–1844), Colonel in the Napoleonic wars
Franciszek Stanisław Hutten-Czapski (1725–1802), Polish Senator, Governor of Chelmno

See also
Czapski family

Polish-language surnames